The Great Seal of the State of Vermont is the official seal of the U.S. state of Vermont, used to emboss and authenticate official documents. It was designed by Ira Allen, brother of Ethan Allen and one of the state's founders.

Great Seal
The seal, depicts a 14-branched pine tree rising from the forest, with a grain sheaf above. The 14 branches symbolize the Thirteen Colonies and Vermont as the 14th state admitted to the union. A cow on the right, representing Vermont's history of dairy farming, also appears. On the top of the seal are wavy lines, possibly suggesting clouds; on the bottom wavy lines suggest water. It is believed that the two sets of wavy lines might also suggest the Connecticut River and Lake Champlain, Vermont's east and west borders. The passage "Freedom & Unity"—Vermont's state motto—is centered below the state name. The motto is central to the Vermont ideal of balancing personal freedom with the individual's responsibility to their community. The seal was first used by the government of the independent Vermont Republic as it existed prior to admission to the Union.

Intended for use to emboss official documents, the seal is not intended for decorative use, the single exception being a large version carved in hardwood and affixed to the Vermont Pavilion at the Expo 67 World's Fair. That seal was later used as a backdrop behind the podium in the Vermont State House Press Briefing Room, which is now the minority party's caucus room. The large wooden Great Seal of Vermont has been moved to the working offices of the governor of Vermont at The Pavilion.

A more naturalistic and colorful armorial representation of the elements of the seal can be seen in the coat of arms of Vermont, which is found on the Vermont flag. It is also used on letterheads and on signs marking state buildings, bridges, state's borders, and at Vermont welcome centers. By Vermont statute, the Great Seal of Vermont is the shared domain of the Vermont Secretary of State, the offices of the state governorship, and the legislative and judiciary branches of government. The original metal dies for the first seal of Vermont are stored at the Secretary of State's office at Redstone, a large red brick and sandstone Queen Anne style house at Montpelier.

Seals of the government of Vermont 
There are various seals of the state government. Most use the coat of arms of Vermont.

See also

Symbols of the State of Vermont

References

Further reading
 Allen, Ira. The natural and political history of the State of Vermont, one of the United States of America. First published 1798, facsimile edition published by Charles E. Tuttle Company. .
 Crampton, William. Webster's Concise Encyclopedia of Flags and Coats of Arms. Crescent Books" 1985. .
 Zieber, Eugene, Heraldry in America: The Civic Armorial Bearings of American States. Greenwich House: 1969.
 Zieber, Eugene, Heraldry in America: A Classic Surverry of Coats of Arms and Insignia. Greenwich House: 1974. .

External links
More information about the state seal
American civic heraldry page

Vermont
Symbols of Vermont